Duna is a Russian pop band formed in 1987. They became popular in 1989 just before the collapse of the Soviet Union with the song "The Land of Limonia".

Members
Viktor "Ryba" Rybin (vocals, percussion - since 1987)
Igor Pliaskin (guitars - since 2002)
Mikhail "Filёvsky Oboroten" Dulsky (guitars - since 1992)
Andrei "Tolsty" Apukhtin (keyboards - since 1991)
Renat "Grach" Sharibjanov (bass guitar - since 1993)
Mikhail "Mefodiy" Yudin (drums - since 2006)

Former members
Dmitri Chetvergov
Andrei Shatunovsky
Sergei Katin
Andrei Rublёv
Aleksandr Serov
Pavel Smeyan
Leonid Petrenko
Sergei Kadnikov

References

External links
Official website 
Duna's poems at Moshkov's library

Eurodisco groups
Russian musical groups
Russian dance musicians
Soviet dance music groups
Russian pop music groups
Soviet pop music groups
Musical groups established in 1987